Robert Sherborne (born  1453  died 1536) was  Bishop of St David's from 1505 to 1508 and Bishop of Chichester from 1508 to 1536.

Sherborne was born in Rolleston on Dove, Staffordshire, and educated at Winchester College and New College, Oxford. He was Master of St. Cross Hospital, near Winchester and a Canon of Wells Cathedral until 1493.

Sherborne was Archdeacon of Huntingdon (1494–1496), Archdeacon of Buckingham and of Taunton (1496–1505) and Dean of St Paul's (1499–1505). Exceptionally, he held ecclesiastical posts prior to ordination: he was made a deacon in 1499 and ordained a priest on 5 March 1501. From 1505 to 1508 he was bishop of St David's.

Sherborne was a patron of the artist Lambert Barnard, commissioning several series of paintings from him. He founded the Free Grammar School in Rolleston, around 1520, which continued to 1909.

References

Sources
 Concise Dictionary of National Biography
 Steer, Francis W., Robert Sherburne Bishop of Chichester: Some Aspects of his Life Reconsidered, Chichester Papers No. 16 (Chichester City Council, 1960)

1450s births
1536 deaths
People from Hampshire (before 1974)
People educated at Winchester College
Alumni of New College, Oxford
Deans of St Paul's
Bishops of St Davids
Bishops of Chichester
Archdeacons of Buckingham
Archdeacons of Huntingdon and Wisbech
Archdeacons of Taunton
16th-century English Roman Catholic bishops